Gretel Schiener (born 9 April 1940) is a retired German gymnast. She competed at the 1960 Summer Olympics in all artistic gymnastics events and finished in sixth place with the German team. Individually her best achievement was 21st place on the balance beam.

References

1940 births
Living people
German female artistic gymnasts
Gymnasts at the 1960 Summer Olympics
Olympic gymnasts of the United Team of Germany
People from Altenburg
Sportspeople from Thuringia